Variegation is the appearance of differently coloured zones in the leaves and sometimes the stems and fruit of plants. Species with variegated individuals are sometimes found in the understory of tropical rainforests, and this habitat is the source of a number of variegated houseplants. Variegation is caused by mutations that affect chlorophyll production or by viruses, such as mosaic viruses, which have been studied by scientists. The striking look of variegated plants is desired by many gardeners, and some have deliberately tried to induce it for aesthetic purposes. There are a number of gardening books about variegated plants, and some gardening societies specialize in them. 

The term is also sometimes used to refer to colour zonation in flowers, minerals, and the skin, fur, feathers or scales of animals.

Causes

Chimeral 

Plants that are chimeras contain tissues with more than one genotype. A variegated chimera contains some tissues that produce chlorophyll and other tissues which do not. Because the variegation is due to the presence of two kinds of plant tissue, propagating the plant must be by a vegetative method of propagation that preserves both types of tissue in relation to each other. Typically, stem cuttings, bud and stem grafting, and other propagation methods that results in growth from leaf axil buds will preserve variegation. Cuttings with complete variegation may be difficult, if not impossible, to propagate. Root cuttings will not usually preserve variegation, since the new stem tissue is derived from a particular tissue type within the root.

Some variegation is due to visual effects caused by reflection of light from the leaf surface. This can happen when an air layer is located just under the epidermis resulting in a white or silvery reflection. It is sometimes called blister variegation. Pilea cadierei (aluminum plant) is an example of a house plant that shows this effect. Leaves of most Cyclamen species show such patterned variegation, varying between plants, but consistent within each plant. Another type of reflective variegation is caused by hairs on parts of the leaf, which may be coloured differently from the leaf. This is found in various Begonia species and garden hybrids. 

Sometimes venal variegation occurs – the veins of the leaf are picked out in white or yellow. This is due to lack of green tissue above the veins. It can be seen in some aroids. The blessed milk thistle, Silybum marianum, is a plant in which another type of venal variegation occurs, but in this case it is due to a blister variegation occurring along the veins.

Pigmentary 

A common cause of variegation is the masking of green pigment by other pigments, such as anthocyanins. This often extends to the whole leaf, causing it to be reddish or purplish. On some plants however, consistent zonal markings occur; such as on some clovers, bromeliads, certain Pelargonium and Oxalis species. On others, such as the commonly grown forms of Coleus, the variegation can vary widely within a population. In Nymphaea lotus, the tiger lotus, leaf variegations appear under intense illumination.

Pathological 
Virus infections may cause patterning to appear on the leaf surface. The patterning is often characteristic of the infection. Examples are the mosaic viruses, which produce a mosaic-type effect on the leaf surface or the citrus variegation virus (CVV). Recently a virus disease, Hosta Virus X (HVX) has been identified that causes mottled leaf coloring in hostas. At first, diseased plants were propagated and grown for their mottled foliage, at the risk of infecting other healthy hostas. While these diseases are usually serious enough that the gardener would not grow affected plants, there are a few affected plants that can survive indefinitely, and are attractive enough to be grown for ornament; e.g. some variegated Abutilon varieties. Nutrient deficiency symptoms may cause a temporary or variable yellowing in specific zones on the leaf. Iron and magnesium deficiencies are common causes of this. Transposable elements can cause colour variegation.

Defensive masquerade 
It has been suggested that some patterns of leaf variegation may be part of a defensive "masquerade strategy." In this, leaf variegation may appear to a leaf mining insect that the leaf is already infested, and this may reduce parasitization of the leaf by leaf miners.

Nomenclature 
By convention, the italicised term variegata as the second part of the Latin binomial name, indicates a species found in the wild with variegation (Aloe variegata). The much more common, non-italicised, inclusion of 'Variegata' as the third element of a name indicates a variegated cultivar of an unvariegated parent (Aucuba japonica 'Variegata'). However, not all variegated plants have this Latin tag, for instance many cultivars of Pelargonium have some zonal variegation in their leaves. Other types of variegation may be indicated, e.g. Daphne odora 'Aureomarginata' has yellow edging on its leaves.

Usage 

Variegated plants have long been valued by gardeners, as the usually lighter-coloured variegation can 'lift' what would otherwise be blocks of solid green foliage. Many gardening societies have specialist variegated plants groups, such as the Hardy Plant Society's Variegated Plant Special Interest Group in the UK. Several gardening books which deal exclusively with variegated plants are available.

In 2020, a variegated Rhaphidophora tetrasperma plant sold at auction for US$5,300. In June 2021, another variegated Rhaphidophora tetrasperma plant sold at auction for US$19,297.

See also 
 Glossary of botanical terms

References

External links 

Plant physiology
Chimerism